Swartzia is a genus of flowering plants in the family Fabaceae. It was named in honor of Swedish botanist Olof Swartz and contains about 200 species. Swartzia is restricted in its geographical distribution to the New World Tropics, where it occurs primarily in lowland rainforests, but also in savannas, pre-montane forests, and tropical dry forests. While it can be found throughout the wet lowlands from Mexico and the Caribbean islands to southern Brazil and Bolivia, Swartzia is most abundant and species-rich in Amazonia, where 10–20 species may co-occur at a single site. The species of Swartzia are mostly trees, ranging from small understory treelets to large canopy emergents. Some species, especially in savannas, are mult-stemmed shrubs.

Fossil record
Many Swartzia fossils from the middle Eocene epoch are known from the United States. 5 fossil dehiscent seed pods and 50 fossil leaflets have been described from the Warman and Lawrence clay pits in Weakley and the Henry Counties, Tennessee. In addition 6 leaflets have been described from the New Lawrence and Miller clay pits in Henry County, Tennessee.

List of species
More than 200 species have been described:

 Swartzia acreana R. S. Cowan

 Swartzia acutifolia Vogel

 Swartzia amazonica Moore
 Swartzia amplifolia Harms
 Swartzia amshoffiana R. S. Cowan
 Swartzia angustifolia Schery
 Swartzia anomala R. S. Cowan
 Swartzia apetala Raddi
 var. apetala Raddi
 var. glabra (Vogel) R. S. Cowan
 Swartzia apiculata R. S. Cowan
 Swartzia aptera DC.
 Swartzia arborescens (Aubl.) Pittier

 Swartzia argentea Spruce ex Benth.

 Swartzia auriculata Poepp.
 Swartzia bahiensis R. S. Cowan
 Swartzia bannia Sandwith
 Swartzia benthamiana Miq.

 Swartzia bombycina R. S. Cowan
 Swartzia brachyrachis Harms

 Swartzia buntingii R. S. Cowan
 Swartzia cabrerae R. S. Cowan

 Swartzia calva R. S. Cowan
 Swartzia canescens Torke
 Swartzia cardiosperma Spruce ex Benth.
 Swartzia caribaea Griseb.
 Swartzia caudata R. S. Cowan

 Swartzia colombiana (R. S. Cowan) Torke
 Swartzia conferta Spruce ex Benth.

 Swartzia corrugata Benth.
 Swartzia costata (Rusby) R. S. Cowan
 Swartzia cowanii Steyerm.

 Swartzia cubensis (Britton & P. Wilson) Standl.—katalox
 Swartzia cupavenensis R. S. Cowan
 Swartzia curranii R. S. Cowan
 Swartzia cuspidata Spruce ex Benth.

 Swartzia davisii Sandwith

 Swartzia dipetala Willd. ex Vogel
 Swartzia discocarpa Ducke

 Swartzia dolichopoda R. S. Cowan
 Swartzia duckei Huber

 Swartzia emarginata (Ducke) Torke
 Swartzia eriocarpa Benth.

 Swartzia fanshawei R. S. Cowan
 Swartzia fimbriata Ducke

 Swartzia flaemingii Raddi

 Swartzia floribunda Benth.
 Swartzia foliolosa R. S. Cowan
 Swartzia fraterna R. S. Cowan
 Swartzia froesii R. S. Cowan

 Swartzia gigantea R. S. Cowan

 Swartzia glabrata (R. S. Cowan) Torke
 Swartzia glazioviana (Taub.) Glaz.

 Swartzia grandifolia Bong. ex Benth.
 Swartzia grazielana Rizzini
 Swartzia guatemalensis (Donn. Sm.) Pittier
 Swartzia guianensis (Aubl.) Urb.
 Swartzia haughtii R. S. Cowan
 Swartzia hostmannii Benth.

 Swartzia ingaefolia Ducke

 Swartzia iniridensis R. S. Cowan
 Swartzia jenmanii Sandwith
 Swartzia jimenezii R. S. Cowan
 Swartzia jororii Harms
 Swartzia kaieteurensis (R. S. Cowan) Torke
 Swartzia katawa R. S. Cowan
 Swartzia klugii (R. S. Cowan) Torke
 Swartzia krukovii R. S. Cowan

 Swartzia laevicarpa Amshoff
 Swartzia lamellata Ducke
 Swartzia langsdorffii Raddi
 Swartzia latifolia Benth.
 Swartzia laurifolia Benth.
 Swartzia laxiflora Benth.
 Swartzia leblondii R. S. Cowan
 Swartzia leiocalycina Benth.
 Swartzia leiogyne (Sandwith) Cowan
 Swartzia leptopetala Benth.
 Swartzia littlei R. S. Cowan

 Swartzia longicarpa Amshoff

 Swartzia longipedicellata Sandwith
 Swartzia longistipitata Ducke
 Swartzia lucida R. S. Cowan

 Swartzia macrocarpa Benth.
 Swartzia macrophylla Vogel
 Swartzia macrosema Harms

 Swartzia macrostachya Benth.

 Swartzia magdalenae Britton & Killip
 Swartzia maguirei R. S. Cowan
 Swartzia manausensis Torke
 Swartzia mangabalensis R. S. Cowan
 Swartzia martii Benth.

 Swartzia mayana Lundell

 Swartzia micrantha R. S. Cowan
 Swartzia microcarpa Benth.

 Swartzia monachiana R. S. Cowan

 Swartzia mucronifera R. S. Cowan
 Swartzia multijuga Vogel

 Swartzia myrtifolia Sm.
 var. elegans (Schott) R. S. Cowan
 var. myrtifolia Sm.

 Swartzia nuda Schery
 Swartzia oblanceolata Sandwith
 Swartzia oblata R. S. Cowan
 Swartzia oblonga Benth.
 Swartzia obscura Huber

 Swartzia oraria R. S. Cowan
 Swartzia oriximinaensis R. S. Cowan
 Swartzia pachyphylla Harms
 Swartzia panacoco (Aubl.) R. S. Cowan

 Swartzia parvifolia Schery
 Swartzia pendula Benth.

 Swartzia pernitida R. S. Cowan
 Swartzia peruviana (R. S. Cowan) Torke
 Swartzia phaneroptera Standl.
 Swartzia piarensis R. S. Cowan
 Swartzia pickelii Ducke
 Swartzia picta Benth.
 Swartzia pilulifera Benth.
 Swartzia pinheiroana R. S. Cowan
 Swartzia pinnata (Vahl) Willd.
 Swartzia pittieri Schery

 Swartzia polita (R. S. Cowan) Torke

 Swartzia polyphylla DC.
 Swartzia prolata R. S. Cowan

 Swartzia racemosa Benth.

 Swartzia ramiflora Torke

 Swartzia recurva Poepp.
 Swartzia rediviva R. S. Cowan
 Swartzia remiger Amshoff

 Swartzia reticulata Ducke
 Swartzia riedelii R. S. Cowan
 Swartzia robiniifolia Vogel
 Swartzia roraimae Sandwith
 Swartzia rosea Martius ex Bentham

 Swartzia santanderensis R. S. Cowan
 Swartzia schomburgkii Benth.
 var. rigida R. S. Cowan
 var. schomburgkii Benth.
 Swartzia schultesii R. S. Cowan
 Swartzia schunkei R. S. Cowan
 Swartzia sericea Vogel

 Swartzia simplex (Sw.) Spreng.
 var. grandiflora (Raddi) Cowan
 var. ochnaceae (DC.) R. S. Cowan
 var. simplex (Sw.) Spreng.

 Swartzia sprucei Benth.

 Swartzia steyermarkii R. S. Cowan

 Swartzia sumorum A.R. Molina

 Swartzia tessmannii Harms

 Swartzia tillettii R. S. Cowan
 Swartzia tomentifera (Ducke) Ducke
 Swartzia trianae Benth.

 Swartzia trinitensis Urb.

 Swartzia ulei Harms

 Swartzia vaupesiana R. S. Cowan
 Swartzia velutina Benth.

 Swartzia wurdackii R. S. Cowan
 Swartzia xanthopetala Sandwith

Recent phylogenetic analyses have revealed several well-supported clades within Swartzia that roughly correspond to previously-erected sections and series in the genus.

Nomina dubia
The following species may or may not be valid:

 Swartzia alato-sericea Barneby
 Swartzia alternifoliolata Mansano
 Swartzia arenarium Ducke
 Swartzia aymardii Barneby
 Swartzia barnebyana Cuello
 Swartzia burchellii Mansano, G.P.Lewis & A.M.G.Azevedo
 Swartzia callistemon Spruce ex Benth.
 Swartzia capixabensis Mansano
 Swartzia capparioides Klotzsch
 Swartzia costaricensis (Britton) N. Zamora 
 Swartzia coriaceifolia Torke
 Swartzia euxylophora Rizzini & A.Mattos
 Swartzia fasciata Rizzini & A. Mattos
 Swartzia flabellipetala Pittier
 Swartzia gracilis Pipoly & A. Rudas Lleras
 Swartzia guttata (D. Don) Standl.
 Swartzia hondurensis (Britton) Dugand
 Swartzia humboldtiana Cuello
 Swartzia invenusta Barneby
 Swartzia juruana Torke
 Swartzia linharensis Mansano
 Swartzia maquenqueana N. Zamora & D. Solano
 Swartzia mazaganensis Ledoux
 Swartzia mexicana M. Sousa & R. Grether
 Swartzia microcalyx Ducke
 Swartzia micropetala Schott
 Swartzia mutisii Britton & Killip
 Swartzia oedipus Barneby
 Swartzia nitens (Kunth) Vogel ex Steud.
 Swartzia oscarpintoana Pipoly & Rudas
 Swartzia palustris Barneby
 Swartzia parvipetala (R.S. Cowan) Mansano
 Swartzia picramnioides Standl. & L.O. Williams ex Torke & N. Zamora
 Swartzia pulcherrima Allem. ex Benth.
 Swartzia shnilis Benoist
 Swartzia stipularis Spruce ex Benth.
 Swartzia submarginata (Benth.) Mansano
 Swartzia subspicata Klotzsch
 Swartzia surinamensis Klotzsch
 Swartzia tomentosa DC.
 Swartzia triptera Barneby
 Swartzia zeledonensis Torke & N. Zamora

References

External links

 The Swartzia Pages

 
Taxonomy articles created by Polbot
Fabaceae genera